Harold "Harry" Watson (1883 – 15 February 1963) was a British athlete who competed at the 1908 Summer Olympics in London. He died in Sutton, London. In the 100 metres, Watson took third place in his first round heat and did not advance to the semifinals.

References

Sources
 profile
 
 
 

1883 births
1963 deaths
British male sprinters
Olympic athletes of Great Britain
Athletes (track and field) at the 1908 Summer Olympics